Iain Campbell Mills (21 April 1940 – 16 January 1997) was a Conservative Party politician in the United Kingdom.

Mills was educated in southern Africa and subsequently worked as a Market Planning Executive for Dunlop.  He served as a councillor on Lichfield District Council from 1974 until 1976.

He entered the House of Commons at the 1979 general election as Member of Parliament (MP) for the constituency of Meriden, and held the constituency until his death shortly before the general election of 1997.  His successor was Caroline Spelman.

The death of Mills from alcohol poisoning at Dolphin Square, London, caused the government of John Major to lose its parliamentary majority. This, along with the Wirral South by-election held a month later, resulted in Major announcing the 1997 general election less than 4 months later.

Sources 

 The BBC Guide to Parliament, BBC Books, 1979, .
 http://www.election.demon.co.uk

External links 
 

1940 births
1997 deaths
20th-century British businesspeople
Alcohol-related deaths in England
Conservative Party (UK) MPs for English constituencies
Conservative Party (UK) councillors
Councillors in Staffordshire
UK MPs 1979–1983
UK MPs 1983–1987
UK MPs 1987–1992
UK MPs 1992–1997